Ahern Glacier is in Glacier National Park in the U.S. state of Montana. The glacier was named after George Patrick Ahern. Meltwater from the glacier feeds Ahern Glacier Falls, a waterfall which descends an estimated  in one sheer drop to a talus slope below en route to Helen Lake. Between 1966 and 2005, Ahern Glacier lost 13 percent of its surface area.

See also
 List of glaciers in the United States
 Glaciers in Glacier National Park (U.S.)

References

Glaciers of Glacier County, Montana
Glaciers of Glacier National Park (U.S.)
Glaciers of Montana